Give It All Away is the 2009 debut album by singer Theo Tams, the winner of the sixth season of the reality television competition Canadian Idol.

Background
Recorded in Toronto, the album was produced by Greg Johnston. It was released on 19 May 2009 on the Sony Music Canada label. The album includes seven songs co-written by Tams, which is more than any previous Canadian Idol winner.

Track listing 
 "I'm Gonna Say" – 3:42
 "Reckless" – 4:05
 "Wait for You" – 4:02
 "Lazy Lovers" – 3:46
 "When I Said Goodbye" – 3:30
 "Fair-Weather Friend" – 3:22
 "Dead Wrong" – 3:33
 "I Ain't Cryin'" – 3:51
 "Manhattan Blue" – 2:57
 "Here We Go Again" – 3:10
 "Let Go" – 3:42
 "I Can't Say I'm Sorry" – 3:48
 "Sing" – 3:54

Release history

Charts

Singles

References

2009 debut albums
Theo Tams albums
Sony Music Canada albums